The Cadw/ICOMOS Register of Parks and Gardens of Special Historic Interest in Wales is a heritage register of significant historic parks and gardens in Wales. It is maintained by Cadw, the historic environment service of the Welsh Government.

The Register
The Register was completed in 2002, but new sites continue to be added. Sites are classed into grades I, II* and II, according to their importance, in the same way as listed buildings. The Register currently includes just under 400 sites, of which 10 per cent grade I and 23 per cent are grade II*.

Grade I listed sites
The following list includes all registered sites listed at Grade I.

Parks and gardens by principal area

Source: Cadw

Other parts of the United Kingdom
Separate registers of parks, gardens and designed landscapes are maintained in the other countries of the United Kingdom:

 The Register of Historic Parks and Gardens of special historic interest in England is maintained by English Heritage
 The Inventory of Gardens and Designed Landscapes in Scotland is maintained by Historic Environment Scotland
 The Register of Parks, Gardens and Demesnes of Special Historic Interest is maintained by the Northern Ireland Environment Agency

See also

ICOMOS

Notes

References

External links
Historic Parks and Gardens, Cadw
Historic Parks and Gardens in Wales: Protection, legislation and the role of the Welsh Historic Gardens Trust, Building Conservation website

 
Heritage registers in the United Kingdom
Listed parks and gardens in the United Kingdom